The Netherlands Chamber Choir (Dutch Nederlands Kamerkoor) is a full-time and independent professional Dutch choir. It was founded in 1937 by a :nl:Felix de Nobel as the Chorus Pro Musica to perform Bach cantatas for the Dutch radio.

For over eighty years, the Nederlands Kamerkoor (Netherlands Chamber Choir) has enjoyed a place at the top of the international choral world. Since the very beginning the choir has been known for being adventurous and innovative. It owes this reputation to commissions of works by both well-known composers and young talent, and a continuous search for new formats and exciting collaborations.

Famous composers such as Francis Poulenc, Frank Martin, Rudolf Escher, Hendrik Andriessen, Mauricio Kagel, Sir John Tavener and Henk Badings composed for the choir. More recently also Sir Harrison Birtwistle, Fred Momotenko and James MacMillan. In the past years, the choir performed newly composed works by a.o. Lera Auerbach, Michel van der Aa, Martin Smolka, Nico Muhly and Sir George Benjamin.

The choir has been praised by critics in and outside the Netherlands: “treacherous harmonies”, according to The Times (London, 2017) and Volkskrant (Amsterdam, 2016): “a leading top ensemble.”

Education and participation is a vital part of the choir's mission. The Netherlands has thousands of amateur choirs and numerous youth choirs. The Nederlands Kamerkoor provides coaching and workshops, and ‘adopts’ choirs as supporting act for their own concerts. Since September 2015 Peter Dijkstra has been chief-conductor of the Nederlands Kamerkoor. He is one of the most in demand choral conductors world-wide. Amongst his predecessors were such renowned conductors like Uwe Gronostay, Tõnu Kaljuste, Stephen Layton, Risto Joost and founder Felix de Nobel.

Discography
 Tehilim: Psalms between Judaism and Christianity. Psalm settings by Tzvi Avni, Sim Gokkes, Louis Lewandowski, Yossele Rosenblatt, :de:Balduin Sulzer, Mendelssohn, Salomone Rossi, Schoenberg, Sweelinck. Gilad Nezer (soloist). Netherlands Chamber Choir, conducted Klaas Stok. Globe 2012

References

External links
 Official website

Dutch choirs
Musical groups established in 1937